Pannalal may refer to

 Pannalal Barupal, Indian politician
 Pannalal Bhattacharya, Bengali singer
 Pannalal Bose, Indian judge
 Pannalal Ghosh, Bengali musician
 Pannalal Jain, Jain scholar.
 Pannalal Patel, Gujarati author
 Pannalal Girdharlal Dayanand Anglo Vedic College, College in Delhi
 Heeralaal Pannalal (1978 film)
 Heeralal Pannalal (1999 film)